Newmachar railway station was a railway station in Newmachar, Aberdeenshire which is now closed.

History
The station was opened on 18 July 1861 by the Great North of Scotland Railway. On the northbound platform was the station building and on the west side was the goods yard. Two signal boxes opened in 1890: north and south. Both were at the north and south end of the northbound platform respectively. The station closed to passengers on 4 October 1965. The signal boxes closed along with it. The station was later bought by the local run 'Whytes Bus Coaches' in the mid-1980s, who relocated to their current location at Mill Pond, half a mile out of Newmachar.

References

Sources
 
 

Disused railway stations in Aberdeenshire
Beeching closures in Scotland
Former Great North of Scotland Railway stations
Railway stations in Great Britain opened in 1861
Railway stations in Great Britain closed in 1965
1861 establishments in Scotland
1965 disestablishments in Scotland